Francisco Aramburu, or Chico (7 January 1922 – 1 October 1997) was a Brazilian footballer who played striker.

Chico, commonly short for Francisco, commenced playing football in 1939 aged 17 in his hometown with EC Ferro Carril. A year later he moved to the state capital Porto Alegre where he was given the opportunity to display his skills in the colours of Grêmio. Just another year later in 1942 he followed an offer from CR Vasco da Gama in the then national capital Rio de Janeiro. the club with the Maltese cross in its crest then was the number five in town after Fluminense, Botafogo, Flamengo America-RJ.

The Uruguayan coach Ondino Viera, who before had won championships with Nacional in Montevideo, CA River Plate in Buenos Aires joined Vasco at the same time. He not only re-introduced the since then typical kit with the diagonal strip but also a number of tactical innovations. The former boxer Mário Américo, who should later acquire later worldwide fame as the physiotherapist of the Brazil national team across seven World Cups from 1950 to 1974, was another new addition to the club.

By 1945 Viera had succeeded in establishing a competitive side and led the Vasco to the sixth state championship – undefeated. The Expresso da Vitrória, the "Victory Express", as which the team should be known from 1945 to 1952 benefited in particular from its strong attack with
Ademir de Menezes, top scorer Lelé, Isaías, Jair da Rosa Pinto und Chico on the left wing. Chico by then Chico was already renowned as an athletic, fast, both-footed dribbler with a sharp shot and was soon considered for the national team.

In December 1945 he debuted for Brazil in São Paulo against Argentina in the series of matches for the Copa Roca. The hosts lost 3–4, but a few days later Brazil defeated Argentina 6–2 in the Estádio São Januário, Vasco's stadium. Chico contributed with one goal to this highest victory of Brazil against the archrival. Brazil secured the trophy in the deciding match at the same place, winning 3:1. Also this series of matches between the two countries was marked by a very robust style. Argentina's Batagliero broke a leg in a duel with the 20-year-old Ademir.

In 1950 FIFA World Cup, he played four games and scored four goals. He played in the famous game with Uruguay, which Brazil lost, known as "Maracanazo", ultimately resulting in Brazil's failure to win the 1950 World Cup.
He was third topscorer he won a Bronze Shoe with Alcides Ghiggia, Telmo Zarra and Estanislau Basora.

Honours
 Southamerican Club Championship: 1948
 Campeonato Carioca: 1945, 1947, 1949, 1950, 1952
 IFFHS Brazilian Player of the 20th Century (15th place)
 IFFHS South American Player of the 20th Century (19th place)
 FIFA World Cup Bronze Boot: 1950
 Brazilian Football Museum Hall of Fame

References

External links 
 [https://web.archive.org/web/20090318023514/http://www.cbf.com.br/ca2/58j.html Chico -  Atacante], Confederação Brasileira de Futebol.
 Chico… o valente de Uruguaiana, O futebol sem as fronteiras do tempo: tardes de Pacaembu, 2013-15-01.
 Marcelo Rozenberg: Chico: Ex-atacante do Vasco e Seleção Brasileira, Terçeiro Tempo: Que Fim Levou? (per 2013-11-15).
 Francisco Aramburu, Flapédia.
 , (Matches Brazi vs. Argentina in the Copa América) Confederação Brasileira de Futebol (per 2010-05-05) via Internet Archive.
 Carlos Maranhão: Um duelo de gigantes - 1946: Na hora da vinganca, pernas quebradas, Placar, 2013-08-03, p. 16, via Mauro Prais, NetVasco, 2008-06-12.
 José Rezende: Vasco, 110 anos, Associação Brasileira de Imprensa

1922 births
1997 deaths
Brazilian footballers
Brazil international footballers
Association football forwards
1950 FIFA World Cup players
Brazilian people of Basque descent
Brazilian people of Spanish descent